I'm Wide Awake, It's Morning is the sixth studio album by American band Bright Eyes, released on January 25, 2005 by Saddle Creek Records (the same day as their seventh album, Digital Ash in a Digital Urn).

The album will be reissued by Dead Oceans alongside a six-track companion EP on November 11, 2022.

Songs
The music video for "First Day of My Life" was directed by John Cameron Mitchell.

This was the first Bright Eyes album to feature Nate Walcott, who is now a permanent member of the band.

"Road to Joy" contains an interpolation of Beethoven's "Ode to Joy". The title of the album is taken from a lyric in this song.

Bright Eyes achieved success on the US charts when the singles "Lua" and "Take It Easy (Love Nothing)" (the latter from Digital Ash) took the top two positions on the Billboard Hot Singles Sales chart in 2004. In 2005, the band set off on a two-part world tour to promote the album along with Digital Ash in a Digital Urn, with the first half of the tour centring on the folk-influenced first album, and the latter half featuring the more electronic second album. Both records made it into the top 20 of the Billboard albums charts, with I'm Wide Awake, It's Morning peaking at number 10 on the Billboard 200 and at number 2 on the Billboard Independent Albums chart. The tour was captured on the album Motion Sickness, released later in the year.

Social commentary

Like the two Bright Eyes albums before it, I'm Wide Awake, It's Morning opens with a spoken recording, this time by Conor Oberst himself. The monologue is a short story about two strangers on an airplane that is about to fall into the ocean. Nearing the crash, one of the passengers begins to sing, "At the Bottom of Everything", the opening song of the album.  The simple, four-chord folk song is one of Oberst's trademark sarcastic social commentaries on American ideals: "We must memorize nine numbers and deny we have a soul. And in this endless race for property and privilege to be won, we must run..."

This song made its television debut on the April 30, 2004 episode of Late Late Show. The short story was replaced with a dedication to the Governor of California, Arnold Schwarzenegger, and the President of the United States, George W. Bush. "Two men I admire a lot," declared Oberst, "for their biceps and for their creepy, fascist agendas", after which Conor counted the song in "1, 2, 6, 6, 6". The conclusion of the story during the bridge was replaced by Oberst shouting "M. Ward for president!"

A music video directed by Cat Solen and starring Evan Rachel Wood and Terence Stamp was later made for the song, based on the story in its introduction, which remained intact.

Critical reception

I'm Wide Awake, It's Morning received widespread acclaim from music critics. At Metacritic, the album received an average score of 85 out of 100, based on 33 reviews, which indicates "universal acclaim". Los Angeles Times describes it as "An album with the simmering glow of a masterpiece." Drowned in Sound critic Sean Adams called the album a "thing of awe", praising the lyrics and "calculated attention to detail". Pitchforks Chris Dahlen gave the album 8.7 out of 10 and states "I'm Wide Awake weaves the personal and the political more fluidly than most singers even care to try, and the consummate tunefulness just strengthens those moments where he pinches a nerve."

In a less positive review, Stephen Thomas Erlewine of AllMusic criticized Oberst's "heavy-handed pretension in the words and [...] affectedness in his delivery", calling the album proof that "instead of reaching musical maturity, he's wallowing in a perpetual adolescence."

Up to 2014, the album had sold 522,000 copies in US. In 2007 it was awarded a gold certification from the Independent Music Companies Association, which indicated sales of at least 100,000 copies throughout Europe.

Year-end rankings
The album was ranked on several lists for best albums released during the year 2005.

Track listing
Original release

I'm Wide Awake, It's Morning: A Companion

PersonnelI'm Wide Awake, It's Morning and Digital Ash in a Digital Urn'' were the first Bright Eyes albums on which Conor Oberst, Mike Mogis, and Nate Walcott became the three permanent members of Bright Eyes.

 Conor Oberst – guitar, vocals
 Mike Mogis – mandolin (tracks 1, 2), pedal steel (tracks 3, 5, 7, 9), 12 string guitar (track 10)
 Nate Walcott – trumpet (tracks 2, 3, 8, 10)
 Nick White – piano (tracks 2, 8), organ (tracks 3, 7, 9, 10), Rhodes (track 5), vibraphone (track 8)
 Jesse Harris – guitar (tracks 1, 2, 5–8)
 Alex McManus – guitar (track 3, 10)
 Tim Luntzel – bass (tracks 1, 3, 6, 7, 8)
 Matt Maginn – bass (tracks 2, 5, 9, 10)
 Jason Boesel – drums (tracks 2, 3, 5, 7, 9)
 Clark Baechle – drums (tracks 3, 7, 10)
 Jim James – vocals (track 1)
 Emmylou Harris – vocals (tracks 2, 7, 8)
 Maria Taylor – vocals (tracks 3, 9)
 Andy LeMaster – vocals (track 3)
 Jake Bellows – harmonica, vocals (track 5)

Charts

References

2005 albums
Bright Eyes (band) albums
Saddle Creek Records albums
Albums produced by Mike Mogis